Charles Swain may refer to:

 Charles Swain (athlete) (1885–1974), Australian athlete
 Charles Swain (poet) (1801–1874), English poet and engraver
 Charles L. Swain (1866–?), Democratic politician from Ohio, United States
 Charles Bunker Swain, member of the Massachusetts House of Representatives in 1877